Twin Lakes is a census-designated place in Greene County, Virginia, United States. The population as of the 2010 census was 1,647.

Geography
Twin Lakes is located in southern Greene County around a set of small reservoirs built on Quarter Creek, a southwest-flowing tributary of Swift Run, which in turn runs south to the North Fork of the Rivanna River, part of the James River watershed.

References

External links
Twin Lakes Homeowners Association

Census-designated places in Greene County, Virginia
Census-designated places in Virginia